The Rough Guide To Voodoo is a world music compilation album originally released in 2013 featuring music inspired and influenced by the Voodoo religious tradition (from West African Vodun to New World Haitian Vodou, Louisiana Voodoo, and related movements). Part of the World Music Network Rough Guides series, the album contains two discs: an overview of the genre on Disc One, and a "bonus" Disc Two highlighting Erol Josué. Disc One features four American tracks, two each from Brazil, Haiti, and Cuba, and one each from Trinidad and Benin. The collection was compiled by Dan Rosenberg and was produced by Phil Stanton, co-founder of the World Music Network.

Critical reception

The album was met with generally positive reviews. Neil Kelly of Pop Matters wrote that Disc One was often "unsettling", and that it "deserves serious consideration for truth in advertising alone." He also praised the accessibility of Disc Two.

Track listing

Disc One

Disc Two
Disc Two is a re-release of the album Régléman by Erol Josué, a Haitian Voodoo priest.

References

External links
 

2013 compilation albums
Voodoo
Voodoo